The Runcorn Ward is a Brisbane City Council ward covering Kuraby, Runcorn, Sunnybank and Sunnybank Hills.

History

Karawatha Ward
The 2007 Electoral Commission Redistribution split the former Runcorn Ward into Karawatha Ward and MacGregor Ward. Gail Macpherson of Labor (who had previously been the representative for Runcorn) ran for Karawatha at the 2008 election and was re-elected. MacPherson retired in 2012 and the election held that year saw Kim Marx elected with a 17.8% swing.

Runcorn Ward
The 2015 Electoral Commission Redistribution created Runcorn Ward, replacing Karawatha Ward while gaining area from MacGregor Ward. These changes increased the LNP margin from 16.3% to 17.3%. Marx went on to win the 2016 election.

Results

References 

City of Brisbane wards